Gerald William Vaughan Hine-Haycock (born 1951), known in his earlier broadcasting career as Gerald Haycock, is a British broadcasting journalist of over thirty years' standing. He is a former correspondent for Independent Television News and BBC News, and has worked for former ITV regional broadcasters Westward Television and HTV West, and for BBC West (all in South West England), latterly as a programme presenter. He later became Director of the BBC Regional News Training Scheme, Course Director of the BBC's Journalist Training Scheme and Head of the BBC's SON&R Centre. From March 2020-March 2021 he was appointed High Sheriff of Devon.

Early life
Hine-Haycock was born on 13 January 1951 in London. He is the son of Brigadier William Hine-Haycock of the Duke of Cornwall's Light Infantry and Felicity Hine-Haycock (née Harrison) of Toorak, a suburb of Melbourne, Australia, and has two sisters, Rozanthe and Daphne.

Education
Hine-Haycock was educated at Wellington College, a boarding independent school for boys (now co-educational) in the village of Crowthorne in Berkshire in South East England, followed by the University of Stirling in the city of Stirling in Central Scotland, where he graduated with BA Honours, and Macalester College, a private liberal arts college in Saint Paul, the capital city of Minnesota, in the United States, where he studied English in 1972–73.

Life and career
Hine-Haycock started in radio as a BBC graduate news trainee. He worked at BBC News, later becoming a reporter on Westward Diary for the-then ITV regional broadcasting contractor for South West England, Westward Television, followed by Independent Television News. In 1981, he joined the regional ITV company HTV West, followed by BBC West, where he presented BBC Points West (between 1991-2000 known as BBC News West), a regional BBC news programme. He then became BBC West's Staff Reporter, responsible for many national news stories across the BBC's output at home and abroad. He later became Director of the BBC Regional News Training Scheme, Course Director of the BBC's Journalist Training Scheme and Head of the BBC's SON&R (Sharing Opportunities across Nations & Regions) Centre, based in Bristol.

He was picked as High Sheriff of Devon for the year 2020–2021.

Family
Hine-Haycock has a wife, Judy, and four children. They live at Hempstone Park in the village of Littlehempston (near the market town of Totnes) in Devon, in South West England, and provide bed-and-breakfast accommodation.

References

External links
 Gerald Hine-Haycock on Facebook
 Gerald Hine-Haycock on Twitter

1951 births
Living people
Macalester College alumni
People educated at Wellington College, Berkshire
Alumni of the University of Stirling
BBC newsreaders and journalists
BBC television presenters
English television journalists
English television presenters
ITN newsreaders and journalists
ITV regional newsreaders and journalists
British people of Australian descent
High Sheriffs of Devon